Kasik (also Romanized as Kasīk; also known as Kāsk) is a village in Karasf Rural District, in the Central District of Khodabandeh County, Zanjan Province, Iran. At the 2006 census, its population was 530, in 111 families.

References 

Populated places in Khodabandeh County